Bhadbhadiya is a big village, a gram panchayat in Neemuch district.

References

Villages in Neemuch district